{{DISPLAYTITLE:C10H14N4O2}}
The molecular formulas C10H14N4O2 (molar mass : 222.3 g/mol) may refer to :
 IBMX, a non-specific inhibitor of phosphodiesterases
 Morinamide